Goobang Shire was a local government area in the Central West region of New South Wales, Australia.

Goobang Shire was proclaimed on 7 March 1906. Its offices were based in the town of Parkes, New South Wales.

It absorbed the Municipality of Peak Hill on 1 November 1971

In 1961 Goobang Shire had a population of 5307.

The Local Government Areas Amalgamation Act 1980 saw the amalgamation of Goobang Shire with the Municipality of Parkes to form Parkes Shire on 1 January 1981.

References

Former local government areas of New South Wales
1906 establishments in Australia
1981 disestablishments in Australia